"Absolutely Everybody" is a song by Australian singer-songwriter Vanessa Amorosi, released as the second single from her debut album, The Power (2000), on 15 November 1999 by Transistor Music Australia. The song reached number six in Australia and number 10 in New Zealand, and when released in Europe the following year, it peaked at number seven in the United Kingdom, number one in Hungary, and the top 10 in five other countries.

Song information
"Absolutely Everybody" debuted and peaked at number six on the Australia ARIA Single Charts, her fourth-highest-charting single to date. It was the 74th-best-selling single of 1999 and the 40th-best-selling single for 2000 in that country. It remained in the ARIA Singles Chart for over six months after its release. In New Zealand, the single peaked at number 10 on 14 May 2000 and spent 27 weeks in the top 50. Shortly after her Olympics performances, the song was released internationally and reached the top 10 in the United Kingdom and throughout Europe. The song's highest peak was in Hungary, where it reached number one.

For her service to music, Amorosi was later awarded the Australian Centenary Medal by the Government of Australia. "Absolutely Everybody", with its positive lyrics, became an unofficial theme song for various cultural events. The song had four different music videos. The first was released in Australia in 1999, followed by the Australian Millennium version; the other two videos were made for the British and German markets, respectively, in 2000.

Track listings

Australian and Japanese CD single
 "Absolutely Everybody" (radio version) – 3:42
 "Absolutely Everybody" (Latino version) – 3:27
 "Absolutely Everybody" (extended version) – 5:16
 "Absolutely Everybody" (Latino extended) – 5:22

UK CD single
 "Absolutely Everybody" (radio version)
 "Absolutely Everybody" (Latino version)
 "Absolutely Everybody" (Almighty Mix)
 "Absolutely Everybody" (video)

UK cassette single
 "Absolutely Everybody" (radio version)
 "Absolutely Everybody" (Almighty Mix)

European CD single
 "Absolutely Everybody" (radio edit) – 3:42
 "Absolutely Everybody" (Latino version) – 3:27

Charts

Weekly charts

Year-end charts

Certifications

Release history

References

1999 singles
1999 songs
Number-one singles in Hungary
Songs written by James Ingram
Songs written by Mark Holden
Vanessa Amorosi songs